Afghanistan participated in the 2016 South Asian Games in Guwahati and Shillong, Afghanistan from 5 February to 16 February 2016.

Medal summary

Medal table
Afghanistan won 7 golds and a total of 35 medals.

References

Nations at the 2016 South Asian Games